Nancy Grace Haigh (born 1946) is an American set decorator who has received nine Academy Award nominations, and won two for her work on the films Bugsy, and Once Upon a Time in Hollywood.

Biography 
Nancy Haigh graduated in 1968 from Massachusetts College of Art (MassArt) with a BFA degree in ceramics. In 1995, the college honored her with a Distinguished Alumna Award.

Nancy began her career in film with Francis Ford Coppola's film Rumble Fish in 1983. Since then, Nancy has been the set decorator for numerous movies in collaboration with the Coen brothers.

Filmography

References

External links
 

Living people
American designers
Massachusetts College of Art and Design alumni
American set decorators
Best Art Direction Academy Award winners
American women artists
Women graphic designers
1946 births
21st-century American women